Politics and Letters: Interviews with New Left Review is critic Raymond Williams's own account of his life and work.  The book is based on a series of interviews given by Williams to the magazine New Left Review and was published in 1979.

The work consists of five Sections: "Biography," "Culture," "Drama," "Literature," and "Politics".

References

1979 non-fiction books
Political autobiographies